Alfredo Arango was a  Cuban baseball player in the Cuban League who played with Almendares from 1885 to 1887 and Habana in 1890-1891.

Arango played in six games for Almendares in the 1885-1886 season, finishing with a .292 batting average. In nine games in 1887, he hit .395. Arango returned for a final Cuban League season in 1890 with Habana. 

He later played a role in the Cuban War of Independence. In February 1895, he joined the independence movement in Havana, but was captured and sent to Spain. From there he escaped to Paris and joined Calixto García's forces. 

Arango was named to the Cuban Baseball Hall of Fame in 1951.

References

Cuban League players
People of the Cuban War of Independence
Almendares (baseball) players
Habana players
Year of birth missing
Year of death missing